Halina Machulska (born March 2, 1929 Łódź, Poland) is a Polish theater, film and television actress.

Machulska is the widow of theater director and actor, Jan Machulski, who died in 2008. The couple's son is Polish film director, Juliusz Machulski. Halina and her husband co-starred together in their son's 1987 film, Kingsajz.

Filmography 
 1998-2003: Miodowe lata - as Lasakowa
 2000-2001: Miasteczko - as grandmother Ola, mother of Wanda Tarnawska
 1998: Matki, żony i kochanki II - as Zofia Stokowa, ex-director of nursery school
 1995: Matki, żony i kochanki - as Zofia Stokowa, ex-director of nursery school
 1987: Kingsajz - as Ewa's mother
 1982: Dolina Issy - as Akulonisowa
 1980: Tylko Kaśka
 1979: Sytuacje rodzinne: Bezpośrednie połączenie - as Irena Tietz, sister of Halina
 1979: Tajemnica Enigmy - as a worker in post office
 1977: Indeks. Życie i twórczość Józefa M. - as mather of Andrzej
 1965: Wyspa Złoczyńców - as a guide in museum

References

External links 
 

1929 births
Actors from Łódź
Living people
Polish film actresses
Polish stage actresses
Polish television actresses
Recipient of the Meritorious Activist of Culture badge